New Forms is an outdoor 1991–1992 bronze sculpture by British artist Tony Cragg, installed at the Museum of Fine Arts, Houston's Lillie and Hugh Roy Cullen Sculpture Garden, in the U.S. state of Texas. It was commissioned by the Museum of Fine Arts, Houston and donated by the Schissler Foundation.

See also

 1992 in art
 List of public art in Houston

References

1992 establishments in Texas
1992 sculptures
Bronze sculptures in Texas
Lillie and Hugh Roy Cullen Sculpture Garden
Works by British people